Hans Peter Manz (born October 7, 1955 in Canberra, Australia) is an Austrian diplomat. He is the son of Austrian diplomats and grew up in Vienna. Hans Peter Manz graduated from the Theresian Academy in Vienna and then studied law receiving a doctorate from the University of Vienna in 1977. 
From 2011 to 2015 Dr. Manz served as Austrian Ambassador to the United States of America, succeeding Dr. Christian Prosl. During his distinguished diplomatic career, Dr. Manz served in a variety of positions, including inter alia, foreign policy advisor to the Chancellor of Austria. His overseas postings included Tehran, Bern and New York City.

Table of Positions

2011-2015:
Austrian Ambassador to the United States

2007-2011:
Austrian Ambassador in Bern / Switzerland

I/2007 – V/2007:
Office of Vice Chancellor and Minister for Finance

X/ 2000 – I/2007:
Foreign Policy Advisor to the Federal Chancellor

I/2000 – IX/2000:
Head of the Department for Political Integration and International Cooperation in the field of Justice and Home Affairs, Ministry for Foreign Affairs, Vienna

IX/1999 – I/2000:
Temporary Head of the Department for International Organizations
Ministry for Foreign Affairs, Vienna

1994–1999:
Minister, Deputy Chief of Mission
Permanent Mission of Austria to the United Nations, New York

1991–1994:
Minister-Counselor, Deputy Chief of Mission at the
Austrian Embassy in Bern / Switzerland

1987-1991:
Advisor, Department for Eastern Europe
Ministry for Foreign Affairs, Vienna

1985–1987:
First Secretary and Deputy Chief of Mission
Austrian Embassy, Teheran / Iran

1981–1985:
Second Secretary, 
Austrian Embassy in Bern / Switzerland

1979–1981:
Ministry for Foreign Affairs in Vienna

References
 Archived page of Austrian Ambassador in the US

Austrian diplomats
Living people
1955 births
Ambassadors of Austria to the United States
University of Vienna alumni